Richard James Baker (born 29 May 1974) is a Scottish Labour politician and former member of the Scottish Parliament (MSP) for the North East Scotland region. He was first elected in the 2003 general election, when he was the youngest sitting MSP. He is a former member of Labour's Shadow Cabinet in the Scottish Parliament having served as the Shadow Cabinet Secretary for Justice and Shadow Cabinet Secretary for Finance.

Baker was born in Edinburgh to an Episcopalian priest father and English teacher mother, and is godson to the then Episcopalian Bishop of Aberdeen, Ian Begg. He was educated at the independent St. Bees School in Cumbria and at Aberdeen University. He was the elected president of the National Union of Students Scotland from 1998 till 2000 and before that the senior vice-president (an elected, full-time sabbatical officer post) at the University of Aberdeen students' representative council (now Aberdeen University Students' Association) in the academic year 1995/96. He is a former Scottish press officer of Help the Aged. Baker is a member of Unite the Union and the Co-operative Party.

In the early part of 2014, he was selected as the Labour candidate for Aberdeen North in the 2015 UK general election, after current MP Frank Doran announced his retirement. However, he lost in the election to Scottish National Party candidate Kirsty Blackman.

In June 2015, Baker announced he would stand in the 2015 Scottish Labour Party deputy leadership election. When the result was announced, he had come third of the three candidates in a close contest with 30% of the vote.

In September 2015, Baker announced he would be stepping down from the parliament at the 2016 election. He instead stood down early in January 2016 to take up a job with Age Scotland. As a list MSP, his seat was taken up by the next person on the Labour list for the North East Scotland region, Lesley Brennan.

Family
Baker's wife, Claire Brennan-Baker became an MSP after the 2007 election, representing the Mid Scotland and Fife region.

References

External links
 
 Richard Baker MSP – Personal website 
 Scottish Labour Party – Crime & Justice

1974 births
Living people
Politicians from Edinburgh
Alumni of the University of Aberdeen
Labour MSPs
People educated at St Bees School
Members of the Scottish Parliament 2003–2007
Members of the Scottish Parliament 2007–2011
Members of the Scottish Parliament 2011–2016
Scottish Episcopalians
Scottish public relations people